Adnan Šećerović (born 1 December 1991) is a Bosnian professional footballer who plays as a defensive midfielder.

Club career
Šećerović had previously played in the Netherlands with Roda JC Kerkrade, NEC, Fortuna Sittard and MVV Maastricht

In the 2014–15 season, Šećerović played with Sloboda Tuzla and Austria Lustenau.  In July 2015, he signed with Radnik Bijeljina. with whom he won the 2015–16 Bosnian Cup.

After Radnik, he also played for Željezničar from 2016 to 2017, Mladost Doboj Kakanj from 2017 until 2018 and for Tuzla City in 2018.

On 17 December 2018, Šećerović signed a two and a half year contract with AEL in Greece.

RoundGlass Punjab 
In September 2022, Šećerović signed for I-League club RoundGlass Punjab.

International career
Šećerović made his international debut for Bosnia and Herzegovina in a friendly 1–0 loss against Mexico on 1 February 2018, coming in as a substitute for Elvis Sarić in the 75th minute.

Club statistics

Club

Honours
'''Radnik Bijeljina 
Bosnian Cup: 2015–16

References

External links

Voetbal International profile 

1991 births
Living people
People from Živinice
Association football midfielders
Bosnia and Herzegovina footballers
Bosnia and Herzegovina international footballers
Roda JC Kerkrade players
NEC Nijmegen players
Fortuna Sittard players
MVV Maastricht players
FK Sloboda Tuzla players
SC Austria Lustenau players
FK Radnik Bijeljina players
FK Željezničar Sarajevo players
FK Mladost Doboj Kakanj players
FK Tuzla City players
Athlitiki Enosi Larissa F.C. players
Riga FC players
FC Pyunik players
FK Sarajevo players
First League of the Federation of Bosnia and Herzegovina players
Eredivisie players
Eerste Divisie players
Premier League of Bosnia and Herzegovina players
2. Liga (Austria) players
Super League Greece players
Latvian Higher League players
Armenian Premier League players
Bosnia and Herzegovina expatriate footballers
Expatriate footballers in the Netherlands
Bosnia and Herzegovina expatriate sportspeople in the Netherlands
Expatriate footballers in Austria
Bosnia and Herzegovina expatriate sportspeople in Austria
Expatriate footballers in Greece
Bosnia and Herzegovina expatriate sportspeople in Greece
Expatriate footballers in Latvia
Bosnia and Herzegovina expatriate sportspeople in Latvia
Expatriate footballers in Armenia
Bosnia and Herzegovina expatriate sportspeople in Armenia